George Augustus Walsh  (22 November 1899 – 15 May 1979) was a New Zealand politician of the National Party.

Biography

He was the oldest of six children of Gemima Howan and Augustus Walsh, who got married at Foxton around 1894. He was educated at Foxton Primary School, Palmerston North Boys' High School and Wellington Technical College. He then became a farmer in Waikato and became involved with Federated Farmers. He was chairman of the meat and wool section and also on the executive of Federated Farmers from 1941 to 1957.

He joined the National Party and was on the party's dominion council and executive and Waikato divisional chairman from 1946 to 1951 before being selected as a parliamentary candidate. At the 17 October 1962 meeting of the New Zealand Parliament's External Affairs Select Committee, Walsh was elected to chair the Committee, on the motion of Defence Minister, Dean Eyre.

Honours and awards
In 1953, Walsh was awarded the Queen Elizabeth II Coronation Medal. He was appointed an Officier of the Order of the British Empire, for services to politics, in the 1973 New Year Honours.

Notes

References

1899 births
1979 deaths
People educated at Palmerston North Boys' High School
New Zealand farmers
New Zealand National Party MPs
Members of the New Zealand House of Representatives
New Zealand MPs for North Island electorates
New Zealand Officers of the Order of the British Empire
20th-century New Zealand politicians